Adli El-Shafei Junior عدلي الشافعي; (born 1 November 1973) is an Egyptian tennis player who competed in the Davis Cup. He played 2 matches for Egypt in the Davis Cup. His career high in ATP singles ranking is number 1,071, which he achieved on 3 August 1992.

References

1973 births
Living people
Egyptian male tennis players